Finland was present at the Eurovision Song Contest 1986, held in Bergen, Norway.

Before Eurovision

National final 
The final was held on 22 February 1986 at the Yle's Studios in Helsinki, and was hosted by journalist Kari Lumikero. The votes of an "expert jury" decided the winner, being "Päivä kahden ihmisen" performed and composed by Kari Kuivalainen. The voting was rather tight and Kuivalainen won by only one point over the second-placing entrant.

At Eurovision
Kuivalainen performed nineteenth on the night of the contest, following Denmark and preceding Portugal. Before performing in Bergen, one line of the song was changed, and the title "Päivä kahden ihmisen" ("Day of two people") was changed to "Never the End." At the close of the voting it had received 22 points, placing 15th in a field of 20 competing countries.

Voting

References

External links
Finnish National Final 1986

1986
Countries in the Eurovision Song Contest 1986
Eurovision